Vlastislav Hofman (6 February 1884 – 28 August 1964) was an artist and architect who lived and worked first in the Austro-Hungarian Empire and later in Czechoslovakia. Though he was a painter, set designer, graphic artist, furniture designer, and author, Hofman is best known as an architect strongly influenced by Cubism.

Life
Born in Jičín in Bohemia, Hofman studied architecture in Prague from 1902 to 1907. He was otherwise self-taught in the arts. He was active in avant garde art movements in his homeland, and he associated with artists and writers of the time, including Karel Čapek. Hofman wrote many pieces on political subjects and the philosophy of art, especially for the journal Právo lidu ("People's Right"). His stage designs were mainly for the Vinohrady Theatre (Divadlo na Vinohradich) in Prague. Hofman's design for director Karel Hilar's 1926 production of Hamlet was particularly notable.

Gallery

References

External links
 Vlastislav Hofman on www.kosmas.cz
 online biography
 Finding aid for Vlastislav Hofman papers and drawings Getty Research Institute, Los Angeles, Accession No. 900189. The Vlastislav Hofman archive contains material from several stages in Hofman's career, and include an extensive collection of letters and postcards from prominent figures in the Czech avant-garde movement;

Czechoslovak architects
Czechoslovak scenic designers
1884 births
1964 deaths
Cubist architects
People from Jičín
Czechoslovak painters